Nederland is a statutory town located near Barker Meadow Reservoir in the foothills of southwest Boulder County, Colorado, United States. As of the 2010 United States Census it had a population of 1,445.

History
Nederland was established in 1874. The town started as a trading post between Ute Indians and European settlers during the 1850s. The town's first economic boom came when minerals such as tungsten, silver, and gold were discovered near Tungsten (east of Nederland), Caribou (northwest of Nederland, 1859), and Eldora (west of Nederland, 1875).

Today Nederland is better known as a gateway to outdoor recreation in the nearby Indian Peaks Wilderness, Rocky Mountain National Park, Roosevelt National Forest, and the recently established James Peak Wilderness.

Name origin
In the mid-19th century the first homesteaders gave a variety of names for the area. The town was first called Dayton, then Browns Crossing. In 1871, when the US Postal Service first set up an office, the name was changed to Middle Boulder after the creek that flows through the center of town (and continues eastward to become Boulder Creek).

The high elevation meant fierce winds and deep winter snow, so the new owners of the mine decided that it was beneficial to bring ore from Caribou down to Middle Boulder for milling. In the Dutch language, Nederland ("Netherlands" in English) means low land, and based on casual usage by the Dutch miners, Middle Boulder came to be known as Nederland. In 1874 the town was incorporated and adopted Nederland as the official name.

Geography
Nederland is located in southwest Boulder County at  (39.961986, −105.510604).

Due west from the town is the Indian Peaks Wilderness within Roosevelt National Forest.

Climate
Nederland has an alpine subarctic climate (Dfc) due to its high altitude. Summer days are warm but nights are cool and frost is possible even in mid-summer. Snowfall is possible most of the year.

Demographics

As of the census of 2010, there were 1,445 people, 657 households, and 349 families residing in the town. The racial makeup of the town was 95.5% White, 0.4% African American, 0.7% Native American, 0.8% Asian, 0.9% some other race, and 1.7% from two or more races. Hispanic or Latino of any race were 4.1% of the population.

There were 657 households, of which 28.5% had children under the age of 18, 41.7% were headed by married couples living together, and 46.9% were non-families. Of all households, 32.6% were made up of individuals, and 4.0% were someone living alone who was 65 years of age or older. The average household size was 2.19, and the average family size was 2.77.

In the town, the population was spread out, with 19.8% under the age of 18, 7.9% from 18 to 24, 34.5% from 25 to 44, 32.0% from 45 to 64, and 5.9% being 65 years of age or older. The median age was 39.5 years. For every 100 females, there were 107.6 males. For every 100 females age 18 and over there were 112.7 males.

For the period 2007–2011, the estimated median income for a household in the town was $69,638, and the median income for a family was $90,329. Male full-time workers had a median income of $60,526 versus $65,052 for females. The per capita income for the town was $31,730. About 7.0% of families and 12.7% of the population were below the poverty line. The median house or condo value in between 2007 and 2011 was estimated at $329,600.

Arts and culture

Annual cultural events
Nederland hosts several major events every year, including the diverse NedFest (Nederland Music & Arts Festival), the historical Miners Day celebration, and the annual Frozen Dead Guy Days festival, all next to Barker Meadow Reservoir.

Frozen Dead Guy Days, which occurs every year in early March, commemorates a substandard attempt by Norwegian immigrant Trygve Bauge to practice cryonics on Bredo Morstoel, his deceased grandfather. In addition to extensive local press, The New York Times covered the festival in 2011 and 2012.

Notable people
Kathy Butler, Olympian runner for Great Britain and Canada
Timothy Duggan, road bicycle racer
Ian MacGregor, road bicycle racer
Rob Savoye, primary developer of Gnash software
Ann Trombley, Olympic cyclist
Carl Wilson, vocalist, founding member of The Beach Boys

Legalization of marijuana
On Tuesday, April 6, 2010, Nederland became the third community in Colorado (after Denver and Breckenridge) to legalize the sale, purchase, possession, consumption, and transportation, cultivation, manufacturing, dispensing of medical marijuana and its concentrates and related paraphernalia for persons 21 years of age and older.

See also

Outline of Colorado
Index of Colorado-related articles
State of Colorado
Colorado cities and towns
Colorado municipalities
Colorado counties
Boulder County, Colorado
List of statistical areas in Colorado
Front Range Urban Corridor
North Central Colorado Urban Area
Denver-Aurora-Boulder, CO Combined Statistical Area
Boulder, CO Metropolitan Statistical Area
Caribou Ranch
Caribou Ranch Open Space Park
Roosevelt National Forest
Frozen Dead Guy Days

References

External links

Town of Nederland official website
Nederland, Colorado, at City-Data.com
Nederland Community Center
Nederland Area Chamber of Commerce
Nederland Community Library
Nederland Middle/Senior High School
Nederland Area Historical Society
Nathan Lazarus Skatepark
NedRink - Nederland Ice and Racquet Park
The Mountain-Ear local newspaper

Towns in Boulder County, Colorado
Towns in Colorado
Populated places established in 1885
1885 establishments in Colorado